Hallvard Aamlid (born 25 January 1973) is a Norwegian politician for the Liberal Party.

He served as a deputy representative to the Norwegian Parliament from Oslo during the term 1997–2001.

Outside politics he works for the publishing house Universitetsforlaget.

References 
 

1973 births
Deputy members of the Storting
Liberal Party (Norway) politicians
Living people
Politicians from Oslo